Waq may refer to:
 Waaq, the name of God in the traditional religion of Cushitic peoples
 Uwaq, or Waq, a clan of the Kazakh Zhuz
 WWHB-CD, formerly known as WAQ, television channel from Florida, US
 Antsalova Airport, IATA code: WAQ, an airport in Madagascar

See also
 Wāqwāq (manga), a Japanese manga series
 Wāḳwāḳ, a legendary island or islands
 WYBR, former call sign: WAAQ, a radio station of Michigan, US
 WAQQ, former call sign: WAAQ, a former radio station of Michigan, US
 WNKS, former call sign: WAQQ, radio station of North Carolina, US